Beans & Greens is the fifth album by American jazz vibraphonist Freddie McCoy which was recorded in 1967 for the Prestige label.

Reception

Allmusic rated the album 2 stars.

Track listing
All compositions by Freddie McCoy except where noted.
 "Beans & Greens" – 4:30   
 "Tony's Pony  3:40   
 "A Whiter Shade of Pale" (Gary Brooker, Keith Reid, Matthew Fisher) – 4:04   
 "I Was Made To Love Her" (Stevie Wonder, Lula Mae Hardaway, Henry Cosby, Sylvia Moy) – 2:05   
 "You Keep Me Hangin' On" (Lamont Dozier, Brian Holland, Eddie Holland) – 3:00   
 "Take My Love (And Shove It Up Your Heart)" – 3:20   
 "Sixth Avenue Stroll" – 5:20   
 "Makin' Whoopee" (Walter Donaldson, Gus Kahn) – 4:20   
 "Doxy" (Sonny Rollins) – 2:50 
Recorded at Van Gelder Studio in Englewood Cliffs, New Jersey on October 2, 1965 (tracks 2-6) and October 4, 1967 (tracks 1 & 7-9)

Personnel 
Freddie McCoy – vibraphone 
Wilbur "Dud" Buscomb, Edward David Williams – trumpet (tracks 2-6)
JoAnne Brackeen – piano
Wally Richardson – guitar (tracks 2-6)
Dave Blume – organ
Joseph Macho (tracks 2-6) Don Payne (tracks 1 & 7-9) – electric bass
Ray Lucas – drums

References 

1968 albums
Freddie McCoy albums
Prestige Records albums
Albums recorded at Van Gelder Studio
Albums produced by Cal Lampley